North Houghton is a hamlet in the civil parish of Houghton in the Test Valley district of Hampshire, England. Its nearest town is Stockbridge, which lies approximately 1.2 miles (2.4 km) east from the hamlet.

Notable people
Henry Schwann (1868–1931), cricketer who later changed his name to Henry Bagehot Swann

Villages in Hampshire
Test Valley